Keith E. Idso is a botanist and vice president of the Center for the Study of Carbon Dioxide and Global Change. He is the brother of Craig D. Idso and son of Sherwood B. Idso. He received his B.S. in Agriculture with a major in Plant Sciences from the University of Arizona and his M.S. from the same institution with a major in Agronomy and Plant Genetics. He completed his Ph.D. in Botany at Arizona State University. In 1994, Idso, along with his father, published a review paper on the topic of increased CO2 levels and their effects on plant growth. The paper concluded that not only did other factors not diminish the ability of CO2 to increase plant growth rates, that "the data show the relative growth-enhancing effects of atmospheric CO2 enrichment to be greatest when resource limitations and environmental stresses are most severe." As of 1999, he was teaching biology in the Maricopa County Community College District as an adjunct professor, a post to which he was appointed in 1996.

In 1998, Idso spoke at the Doctors for Disaster Preparedness' annual meeting in Scottsdale, Arizona. His talk was entitled "Direct Biological Effects of Increasing Levels of Atmospheric Carbon Dioxide." In 1999, Idso was appointed by the Arizona Speaker of the House of Representatives to serve on the Arizona Advisory Council on Environmental Education.

References

Year of birth missing (living people)
Living people
University of Arizona alumni
Arizona State University alumni
Maricopa County Community College District
21st-century American botanists